St. Paul station is a DART Light Rail station in Dallas, Texas. It is located on Bryan Street, between St. Paul and Harwood Streets, near the Arts District in Downtown Dallas.

St. Paul station takes its name from its namesake street, which received its name in the 1930s, not out of religious interest, but as a protest against the Volstead Act, a national law that banned alcoholic beverages. The city fathers located a passage in the Bible, attributed to St. Paul, that said "drink a little wine, for your stomach's sake".

References

External links
 Dallas Area Rapid Transit - St. Paul Station

Dallas Area Rapid Transit light rail stations in Dallas
Railway stations in the United States opened in 1996
1996 establishments in Texas
Railway stations in Dallas County, Texas